Olesno is a town in Opole Voivodship, Poland about  north-east of the city of Opole. It is the capital of Olesno County and seat of the Gmina Olesno.

History

The area near the ancient Amber Road had been settled since the Neolithic era. Olesno was first mentioned in a 1226 deed by Bishop Wawrzyniec of Wrocław though it may refer to the neighbouring village of Stare Olesno (Old Olesno). It was part of the duchies of Opole, Silesia and again Opole of fragmented Piast-ruled Poland. In 1229 it was acquired by Duke Henry I the Bearded of Wrocław. Olesno became seat of a castellan and received town rights in 1275 from Duke Władysław Opolski. A mint was also located in the town. It then was a part of the Duchy of Opole which became a fiefdom of the Kingdom of Bohemia in 1327 and was finally incorporated into the Holy Roman Empire by Charles IV in 1355, however, it remained under the rule of local Polish dukes within the Duchy of Opole until its dissolution in 1532. The town suffered during the Thirty Years' War, and in 1645 it returned to Poland under the House of Vasa until 1666, when it fell again to Bohemia.

In 1708 it was hit by a plague epidemic. After the First Silesian War and the Treaty of Breslau (Wrocław) in 1742 Olesno was annexed by the Kingdom of Prussia, and in 1815 became part of the Province of Silesia. During the Napoleonic Wars, in 1806, the town was captured by French troops. Despite Germanisation policies, in the 19th century the town was a significant Polish center in Upper Silesia, and from 1848 the first local Polish newspaper Telegraf Górnośląski was published. After World War I, in 1919 and 1921, the Silesian Uprisings were fought there, the aim of which was to reintegrate the town with Poland after it regained independence in 1918. In the Upper Silesia plebiscite of 20 March 1921 3,286 inhabitants voted to remain in Germany, 473 for Poland. Thus Rosenberg remained part of the Weimar Republic. After the outbreak of World War II in 1939, the German authorities arrested local Polish activists. On 21 January 1945 it was taken by the Soviet troops of the 5th Guards Army.

The Olesno Regional Museum was founded in 1960.

Notable people
  (1797–1863), Polish activist, poet and publisher
 Hermann Friedberg (1817–1884), physician
 David Rosin (1823–1894), theologian
 Reinhold Saltzwedel (1889–1917), U-boat commander
 Helmuth von Pannwitz (1898–1947), general
 Georg Burgfeld (1909–1957), highly decorated Hauptmann in the Wehrmacht
 Rudy Kennedy (1927–2008), rocket scientist
 Franciszek Kokot (born 1929), Polish nephrologist and endocrinologist
 Adam Ledwoń (1974–2008), football player

Twin towns – sister cities
See twin towns of Gmina Olesno.

Gallery

Notes

References

External links
Official town webpage
German page about Olesno
Jewish Community in Olesno on Virtual Shtetl

Cities in Silesia
Cities and towns in Opole Voivodeship
Olesno County